Keith Allen (born 9 November 1943) is an English former professional footballer.

Career
After playing youth football on his native Isle of Wight with Ryde Sports, Allen was signed by Portsmouth in 1962. He did not make a single appearance during two years at Fratton Park, and was sold in 1964 to Grimsby Town, where he made six league appearances during the 1964–65 season, scoring once. At the end of the season he moved, this time to join Stockport County, where he became a more regular fixture in the first-team, making 49 league appearances over two seasons and scoring 15 times.

This improved form attracted the attention of Luton Town, who signed the 23-year-old Allen in 1967. Allen played over 150 times for Luton over three seasons, and scored 43 goals in all competitions as the club won two promotions. He is particularly remembered by fans of both Luton and Stockport for giving away a penalty at Kenilworth Road when the two clubs met in a Football League Division 3 match on 25/04/1969. A  fan in the crowd blew a whistle and Allen, thinking that play had been stopped, caught the ball. Allen was sold in 1970, to Plymouth Argyle, where he spent three seasons before ending his career.

References

1943 births
Living people
English footballers
English Football League players
Grimsby Town F.C. players
Stockport County F.C. players
Luton Town F.C. players
Plymouth Argyle F.C. players
People from Newport, Isle of Wight
Ryde Sports F.C. players
Portsmouth F.C. players
Association football forwards